Handnesøya is an island in the municipality of Nesna in Nordland county, Norway.  The  island lies between the islands of Tomma and Hugla and the mainland, along the Sjona fjord.  The mountainous island has a very narrow flat area on the east and west sides where the island's residents live.  There is a ferry connection from the village of Handnesneset on the southern tip of the island to the village of Nesna on the mainland and to the island of Tomma.  Handnesøya Chapel is located in the village of Saura on the western side of the island.

See also
List of islands of Norway

References

Islands of Nordland
Nesna